Domenichelli is an Italian surname. Notable people with the surname include:

Giuseppe Domenichelli (1887–1955), Italian gymnast
Hnat Domenichelli (born 1976), Canadian-Swiss ice hockey player

Italian-language surnames
Patronymic surnames
Surnames from given names